Interstate 530 (I-530) in Arkansas is a spur route of the Interstate highway system, traveling  from Pine Bluff north-northwest to Little Rock at an interchange of I-30/I-440/U.S. Highway 65 (US 65)/US 67/US 167. The highway also travels through the cities of Redfield and White Hall. In the future, I-530 will be extended to I-69 west of Monticello. A short section near the future I-69 alignment has been signed as Highway 530 (AR 530).

Route description

The route begins at a high volume intersection with I-30/I-440/US 65/US 67/US 167 in southeast Little Rock. This intersection handles over 100,000 vehicles per day on average. I-530 runs south with US 65 and US 167 through marshland, entering Saline County briefly to split with US 167 south (exit 10). At exit 10, the junction can only accessed by southbound I-530. Northbound I-530 must take exit 9 then come back southbound to access exit 10. After returning to Pulaski County, I-530 has an exit at Hensley with Hensley Road (exit 15, which also connects to AR 365) before entering Jefferson County.

I-530 continues south, passing through forested land and clear cut areas, also running parallel to AR 365. I-530 intersects AR 46 (exit 20) in Redfield before entering White Hall. After an intersection with AR 256 (Holland Avenue, exit 32), the route runs south to serve as the eastern terminus for US 270 at exit 34. This exit also contains Highway 365 Spur (AR 365 Spur) eastbound to White Hall and Sheridan Street. Continuing south to Pine Bluff, I-530 serves as a beltway around the city. I-530 skirts the city to the southwest, including exits for AR 190 (West 19th Street, exit 37), US 79/U.S. Highway 79 Business (US 79B, South Camden Road, exit 39), and US 63/US 63B (South Olive Street, exit 43).

The Interstate ends at a very large junction with US 63/US 65/US 65B/US 79/US 425/AR 190, after which the roadway continues south as US 65/US 425 toward Dumas.

This Interstate Highway is unusual in that its exit number increase south rather than north. However, the standard for spurs is to increase from the beginning at the parent.

I-530 State Scenic Byway
The route passes over Bayou Bartholomew and the Mississippi Alluvial Plain. The southern portion was formerly a wetland preserve, but now the land is being developed.

Points of interest
Arkansas Entertainers Hall of Fame
Arkansas Railroad Museum
Pine Bluff Commercial Historic District

History

The current route was formerly designated as US 65. Today, I-530 and US 65 run concurrently as a four-lane, limited-access spur route. The route formally gained the I-530 designation after a full Interstate-grade bypass of Pine Bluff (known locally as the Wiley Branton Highway) replaced a segment of US 65 through Pine Bluff that contains at-grade intersections. This segment (known locally as the Martha Mitchell Expressway) was redesignated US 65B; US 65 was rerouted to the bypass before gaining the I-530 codesignation.

Exit list

Future

Arkansas Highway 530

A planned extension of the route pushes the Interstate south to US 278 in Wilmar. The first segment of the extension from US 278 north to AR 35 opened as a two-lane expressway designated Arkansas Highway 530 (AR 530) on June 6, 2006. This extension is intended to connect to the proposed southern extension of I-69; US 278 at Wilmar also provides four-lane access to the future I-530 from the larger cities of Warren and Monticello, thus allowing both to champion its completion.  Though sufficient right-of-way was provided and grading done for interchanges at both ends as well as two additional lanes, this segment presently has stop signs at both ends and an intersection with Bradley County Road 96 (CR 96)/Barkada Road; it is otherwise a two-lane expressway in between.

The second segment of the extension opened in September 2013. Currently, the segment is two lanes until further funding is available.

The remaining segments between AR 35 and Pine Bluff will also be built as a partial two-lane freeway, similar to the existing AR 35–US 278 segment and Pine Bluff intersection to AR 114 segment. Initially, the only full interchange will be with the present I-530 at Pine Bluff; grade crossings will be built at other planned interchanges, but the stretches between grade crossings will be true two-lane expressways with grade separations and service roads where needed. The route includes sufficient right-of-way to build interchanges and two additional lanes later; the Pine Bluff interchange will be a full freeway-to-freeway facility designed for the future four-lane freeway. On August 18, 2015, the next segment—AR 114 to AR 11—was open to traffic. The segment from AR 11 to AR 35 is not yet built. Eventually, the route will connect Pine Bluff and Little Rock to I-69.

Major intersections

References

30-5
5
30-5
Transportation in Jefferson County, Arkansas
Transportation in Little Rock, Arkansas
Transportation in Pine Bluff, Arkansas
Transportation in Pulaski County, Arkansas
Transportation in Redfield, Arkansas
Transportation in Saline County, Arkansas
Arkansas Scenic Byways